The 8th Internationales AdV Avusrennen was a Formula Two motor race held on 28 September 1952 at the AVUS circuit. The race was run over 25 laps of the circuit, and was won by Swiss driver Rudi Fischer in a Ferrari 500. Fischer also set fastest lap. Hans Klenk finished second and Fritz Riess was third.

Results

References

Avusrennen
Avusrennen
Avusrennen